Woman is the debut studio album by Canadian/Danish R&B duo Rhye. The album was released worldwide on March 1, 2013 by Polydor Records, except in North America where it was released on March 5 through Loma Vista Recordings, Innovative Leisure, and Republic Records. The album's release followed the singles "Open" and "The Fall", both of which appear on the album.

Critical reception

Woman was very well received by critics, with many comparing the album's sound to the artist Sade. The album currently holds a 79/100 rating on Metacritic.

The album was named a longlisted nominee for the 2013 Polaris Music Prize on June 13, 2013.

Track listing

Charts

Weekly charts

Year-end charts

Personnel

Music
 Rhye - arranger, horn arrangements, instrumentation, vocals, string arrangements
 Thomas Drayton - bass
 Andreas Halberg - bass
 Elizabeth Lea - trombone, horn arrangements
 Tom Lea - viola, violin, string arrangements
 Rebekah Raff - harp
 August Rosenbaum - piano
 Itai Shapiro - guitar
 Todd Simon - flugelhorn, trumpet, horn arrangements
 Tracy Wannomae - clarinet, flute, saxophone, horn arrangements

Production
 Rhye - engineer, mixing, producer
 Tom Coyne - mastering
 Bjorn Gjessing - piano engineer
 Mads Oustrup - mixing

Artwork and Design
 Stuart Hardie - art direction, design
 Rachell Smith - photography

References

2013 debut albums
Polydor Records albums
Rhye albums